Meymuneh (also Romanized as Meymūneh and Meimooneh; also known as Eslāmābād, Maimanen, Maimūn, and Meymūn) is a village in Rostaq Rural District, in the Central District of Saduq County, Yazd Province, Iran. At the 2006 census, its population was 1,072, in 286 families.

References 

Populated places in Saduq County